Robert Wilson may refer to:

Entertainment

Authors
 Robert Anton Wilson (1932–2007), American writer, futurist, and mystic
 Robert Burns Wilson (1850–1916), American painter and poet
 Robert C. Wilson (born 1951), American novelist and lawyer
 Robert Charles Wilson (born 1953), Canadian science fiction writer
 Robert McLiam Wilson (born 1966), Northern Irish novelist
 Robert McNair Wilson (1882–1963), British surgeon, fiction writer, and politician
 Robert Wilson (crime novelist) (born 1957), British crime novelist
 Robert Wilson (dramatist) (died 1600), English Elizabethan dramatist
 Robert Wilson (editor) (born 1951), American magazine editor and author

Musicians
 Rob Wilson, known as Fresh I.E., Canadian rapper
 Robert Wilson (tenor) (1907–1964), Scottish tenor
 Robert Wilson (American singer) (1957–2010), American R&B and funk musician in The Gap Band
 Robert Wilson (music entrepreneur) (born 1951), British musician and charity founder
 Juice Wilson (Robert Wilson, 1904–1993), American jazz violinist
 Robert Wilson (born 1980), Bobby V, American R&B singer formerly known as Bobby Valentino

Other entertainment
 Robert Scott Wilson (born 1987), American model and actor
 Robert Wilson (director) (born 1941), American avant-garde stage director and playwright

Military
 Sir Robert Wilson (British Army officer, born 1777) (1777–1849), British Army general
 Robert Wilson (British Army officer, born 1911) (1911–2002), British Army special operations officer
 Robert L. Wilson (1920–1944), United States Marine and Medal of Honor recipient

Politics
 Robert A. Wilson (Virginia politician) (1913–2003), vice mayor of Richmond, Virginia
 Robert Wilson (Missouri politician) (1803–1870), U.S. Senator from Missouri
 Robert L. Wilson (politician) (1805–1880), American politician
 Robert Patterson Clark Wilson (1834–1916), U.S. Representative from Missouri
 Robert D. Wilson (1839–1930), member of the Wisconsin State Assembly
 Robert Richard Wilson (1891–1969), farmer and politician in South Australia
 Robert Wilson (Australian politician) (1896–1973), New South Wales politician
 Robert John Wilson, Member of Parliament in 1922 for Jarrow
 Robert Wilson (Manitoba politician) (born 1934), Manitoba politician
 Robert J. Wilson, candidate in the 1953 Manitoba provincial election
 Rob Wilson (born 1965), British politician and entrepreneur, MP for Reading East
 Robert Nichol Wilson, Northern Irish politician
 Robert Wilson (Texas politician) (1793–1856), land speculator and politician in Texas
 Gordon Wilson (Scottish politician) (Robert Gordon Wilson), Scottish politician and solicitor

Science
 Robert Wilson (physician) (1829–1881), wrote about the British mining industry
 Robert O. Wilson (1906–1967), American physician
 Robert R. Wilson (1914–2000), American physicist
 Robert Wilson (astronomer) (1927–2002), British astronomer
 Robert Woodrow Wilson (born 1936), American astronomer and physicist
 Robert B. Wilson (born 1937), Nobel Prize-winning American economist and professor at Stanford University

Sports

American football
 Robert Wilson (running back) (born 1969), American football player
 Robert Wilson (wide receiver) (1974–2020), American football player
 Robert P. Wilson, American football player and coach

Rugby
 Robert Wilson (rugby league) (1879–1916), rugby league footballer for England and Broughton Ranchers
 Robert Wilson (rugby union, born 1854) (1854–1911), Scottish rugby union player
 Robert Wilson (rugby union, born 1861) (1861–1944), rugby union player for New Zealand in 1884

Other sports
 Robert Wilson (bobsleigh) (born 1954), Canadian Olympic bobsledder
 Robert Wilson (cricketer, born 1916) (1916–2004), Scottish cricketer
 Robert Wilson (cricketer, born 1922) (1922–1980), English cricketer
 Robert Wilson (cricketer, born 1934), English cricketer
 Robert Wilson (cricketer, born 1935) (1935–1987), Scottish cricketer
 Robert Wilson (Canadian rower) (born 1935), Canadian Olympic rower
 Robert Wilson (tennis) (1935-2020), tennis player in the 1960s
 Robert Wilson (American rower) (born 1939), American Olympic rower
 Robert Wilson (cricketer, born 1948), New Zealand cricketer
 Rob Wilson (racing driver) (born 1952), racing driver from New Zealand
 Robert Wilson (footballer, born 1961), English football player for Fulham
 Rob Wilson (ice hockey) (born 1968), Canadian-British professional ice hockey coach
 Robert Wilson (Scottish footballer), Scottish footballer (Partick Thistle}

Other
 Robert Arnott Wilson (born 1958), British mathematician
 Robert Dick Wilson (1856–1930), American linguist and Presbyterian scholar
 Robert E. Lee Wilson (1865–1933), American cotton plantation owner
 Robert W. Wilson (philanthropist) (1926–2013), American hedge fund manager and philanthropist
 Robert Wilson (architect) (1834–1901), Scottish architect
 Robert Gordon Wilson (architect) (1844–1931), Scottish architect
 Robert Wilson (businessman) (born 1942/1943), British businessman
 Robert Wilson (engineer) (1803–1882), Scottish engineer and inventor
 Robert Wilson (philosopher) (born 1964), philosophy professor
 Robert Wilson (priest, born 1840) (1840–1897), English Anglican priest and academic, warden of Keble College, Oxford
 Robert Wilson (dean of Ferns), 17th-century Anglican dean in Ireland
 Robert Wilson (ship captain) (1806–1888), Great Lakes captain who helped slaves escape
 Robert Wilson (merchant) (1832–1899), New Zealand merchant and company director
 Robert M. Wilson Jr. (1952–2012), Arkansas lawyer
 Robert & William Wilson, American silversmith in Philadelphia
 Robert Kenneth Wilson, surgeon who in 1934 supposedly took a photograph purporting to show the Loch Ness Monster

See also
 Bert Wilson (disambiguation)
 Bob Wilson (disambiguation)
 Bobby Wilson (disambiguation)
 Robert Willson (disambiguation)
 Robert Gordon Wilson (disambiguation)
 Robert Lee Wilson (disambiguation)
 USS Robert L. Wilson (DD-847), United States Navy destroyer